The Kanpur Metro is a mass rapid transit (MRT) system in Kanpur, Uttar Pradesh, India. The metro is owned and operated by the Uttar Pradesh Metro Rail Corporation (UPMRC).

The feasibility study for the project was done by RITES in June 2015. The government approved two corridors as per Detailed Project Report (DPR). The tenders were floated for the priority section of corridor-1 between IIT Kanpur to Motijheel. The company Afcons Infrastructure was awarded the tender. 

On 28 February 2019, the Central Government approved the metro project for Kanpur at an estimated cost of ₹ 11,076.48 crores and a five-year time limit. Construction work began on 15 November 2019, with the first section opening in December 2021. In phase 1, the Orange Line began with the 8.98 km (5.3 mi) stretch from IIT Kanpur to Motijheel. The metro will be extendable in the following phases to the Kanpur metropolitan area.

The first phase was inaugurated by Prime Minister Narendra Modi on 28 December 2021.

Route Network 
In Phase 1, 21 metro stations will be built on Orange Line from IIT Kanpur to Naubasta and 8 metro stations will be built on Blue Line  from Agriculture University to Barra-8.

Orange Line (IIT Kanpur - Naubasta)
Length : 23.8 km

Alignment : Elevated (15.2 km) & Underground (8.6 km)

No. of Stations : 21

Stations :
 IIT Kanpur
 Kalyanpur
 SPM Hospital
 Vishwavidyalaya
 Gurudev Chauraha
 Geeta Nagar
 Rawatpur (Interchange to Blue Line )
 LLR Hospital
 Moti Jheel
 Chunniganj
 Naveen Market
 Bada Chauraha
 Nayaganj
 Kanpur Central Railway Station
 Jhakarkati Bus Terminal
 Transport Nagar
 Baradevi
 Kidwai Nagar
 Vasant Vihar
 Baudh Nagar
 Naubasta (Bumba)

Blue Line (Agriculture University - Barra-8)
Length : 8.6 km

Alignment : Elevated (4.2 km) & Underground (4.4 km)

No. of Stations : 8

Stations :
Agriculture University
Rawatpur (Interchange to Orange Line )
Kakadeo
Double Pulia
Vijay Nagar

Shastri Chowk
Barra-7
Barra-8

Current Network

Operations 

The trains operate at a frequency of five minutes between 06:00 am and 11:00 pm currently which will gradually reduce with ridership. The trains will operate with ATO over CBTC, with a design speed of 90 km/h and an operational speed of 80 km/h. Automated station announcements are recorded in Hindi and English. Many stations will have services such as ATMs, food outlets, cafés, convenience stores and mobile recharge. Eating, drinking, smoking and chewing gum are prohibited in the entire system.

Ticketing and recharge

Fare collection

Construction Detail
Elevated viaduct work has begun, more than 400 out of 538 pillars have been constructed and all the 439 double T-girders have been erected for making the base of the 9 stations of priority corridor. The pier caps and U-girders are being erected and construction work is going in full swing. The priority section of corridor-1 became operational in December 2021.

Rolling stock

In July 2020, Bombardier Transportation (acquired by Alstom) won the Agra Metro and Kanpur Metro rolling stock, and the signalling contract and manufacturing started on 26 Feb 2021. UPMRC's Managing Director Shri Kumar Keshav inaugurated the Rolling Stocks (Metro Trains) manufacturing in Bombardier’s Savli Plant in Gujarat, located near Vadodara.

Kanpur to get total 39 trains of 3 Metro coaches (which would total up to 117 compartments) each for both the corridors of the Kanpur Metro Project, including Corridor-I i.e. From IIT to Naubasta and Corridor-II i.e. From Agriculture University to Barra-8. These trains have been designed with assistance from Bombardier Germany and design experts at Bombardier’s Hyderabad office.

The trains are in line with utmost passenger safety and energy conservation, and each train is equipped with Communication Based Train Control System (CBTC) for Automatic Train Operations. These ultramodern trains have a state-of-the-art design for safe operation, energy efficiency and passenger comfort. These trains will also be equipped with CO2 sensor-based air-conditioning system to save energy during operations.

Valued at approximately ₹2051 crore (245 Mn EUR), Alstom’s scope on the Agra-Kanpur metro project includes – the design, build and delivery of total 201 metro cars (67 MOVIA metro three-car trainsets) and an advanced signalling solution (CITYFLO 650).

Places of Tourist interest on Priority Corridor

IIT Kanpur
Buddha Park, Kalyanpur
Kanpur Zoo
Luv Kush Barrage & Boat Club
Kanpur Metro Depot
Miraj Cinemas (Gurudev Pammi)
Kakadeo Market
Rave Moti Mall
J.K. Temple
GSVM College
Hallet Hospital (LLR)
Motijheel
Swaroop Nagar Market

Cost

The cost of construction is estimated at ₹11,076.48 crores for two lines in Phase I.

Timeline
 Sep 2015: Proposed formation of Kanpur Metro Rail Corporation.
 Nov 2015: Detailed Project Report (DPR) prepared by LMRC and RITES is submitted to the state government.
 Feb 2016: State Government is planning to lay the foundation stone of Kanpur Metro in March 2016 after state cabinet approval.
 Feb 2016: It is expected that civil work on Kanpur Metro will start by Dec 2016.
 Mar 2016: Uttar Pradesh Government approves the DPR.
 Mar 2016: Japanese team inspected the metro route in the city.
 May 2016: European Investment Bank (EIB) ready to fund city metro project.
 May 2016: Centre approves the plan for Kanpur Metro.
 Jul 2017: Civil work started.
 Sep 2017: Civil engineering work comes to a halt. Central Govt has asked Kanpur Metro to rework the detailed project report and finances and asked to make it a public-private partnership model project.
 Oct 2017: Work on preparing new detailed project report started. The new report is to take approximately three months.
 Apr 2018: Center yet to approve of the Kanpur Metro project.
 Jun 2018: Finance Ministry gave its in-principle approval to Kanpur Metro along with Agra, Meerut, Indore, and Bhopal.
 Sep 2018: Detailed Project Report sent by Uttar Pradesh Government to the central government.
Feb 2019: Uttar Pradesh government has allocated ₹175 crores to start preliminary work in budget, as of 7 February.
Feb 2019: Centre approved Kanpur Metro costing ₹ 11076.48 crores with the time limit of 5 years in construction, as of 28 February.
Jul 2019: UPMRC invites tender for construction of elevated track and stations.
 Aug 2019: The metro route alignment is to be changed to avoid demolition of some portions of GSVM Medical College.
Sep 2019: Afcons Infra awarded tender to construct 9 stations along with tracks and elevated viaduct, as of 6 September.
Sep 2019: Afcons Infra and UPMRC conduct a thorough route inspection from IIT to Motijheel for the construction of track and metro station, as of 20 September.
Sep 2019: UPMRC razes the polytechnic hostels for depot construction, as of 22 September.
Oct 2019: UPMRC and Afcons Infra begin with pillar construction for elevated track in front of the National Sugar Institute.
Nov 2019: Yogi Adityanath, the CM of Uttar Pradesh, formally inaugurates civil work for Kanpur Metro.
Feb 2020: Yogi Adityanath, the CM of Uttar Pradesh, allocates a budget of ₹ 358 crores towards Kanpur Metro phase 1. Construction is in full swing as UPMRC aims to complete phase 1 at a faster pace, as compared to Lucknow Metro, as of 19 February.
Feb 2020: UPMRC invited bids for installation of Traction System (Package I & II), as of 20 September.
Mar 2020: Afcons Infra erected the first pier cap in record time. Construction is 3 months ahead as compared to Lucknow Metro, which is accredited with the title of being the fastest metro construction in India, as of 2 March.
Mar 2020: UPMRCL opened bids for the General Consultant contract to reveal a total of 2 bidders, as of 13 March.
Jun 2020: TYPSA - Italferr JV wins the General Consultant contract for Kanpur Metro.
Jul 2020: Alstom won Kanpur Metro's & Agra Metro's rolling stock and signalling contract.
July 2020: UPMRC floats tenders for construction of underground section till Nayaganj, as of 15 July.
Jul 2020: UPMRC places a double T- girder on IIT Kanpur Metro Station, as of 24 July.
Sep 2020: EIB to invest 650mn Euros for Kanpur Metro, as of 1 September.
Sep 2020: Shapoorji Pallonji Group's subsidiary Sterling & Wilson Pvt. Ltd. in a consortium with Russia’s GSC Construction Company won Kanpur Metro's 750 Volts DC Third Rail Electrification Bid for Corridor-1 & 2, as of 2 September.
Oct 2020: 100th U-girder erected. A total of 638 U-girders are to be placed for the priority corridor between IIT Kanpur & Motijheel.
Jan 2021: 400 piers out of 513 piers for the priority corridor constructed. 332 T-girders constructed out of total number of 434 T-girders to be constructed for priority corridor.
Feb 2021: Uttar Pradesh budget 2021-22 allocates ₹ 597 cr for Kanpur metro rail project.
May 2021: The base of the elevated metro track for the 5 km stretch of the 9 km long priority section from IIT to Motijheel of Kanpur Metro has been prepared. There is 622 U-girder erection in this section, out of which 400 U-Girder erection has been done. The construction of the IIT Metro Station almost completed and finishing work is also in the final stage. Along with the metro station prepared the installation of signals and electrical equipment are started. UPMRC successfully erected the 45-meter steel span girder at Rawatpur Tiraha.
May 2021: On this day, UPMRC made another step in the Kanpur Metro project and introduced ballast-less track casting. The first crossover point (track changing point) was cast in the Kanpur Metro Project, as of 11 May.
May 2021: On this day, achievement has been added to the name of Kanpur Metro. The 9 km long Priority Corridor being built from IIT to Motijheel received ISO (International Organization for Standardization) certificate. Priority Corridor has received ISO 14001 Certificate for Environment Management and 45001 Certificate for Safety Management, as of 18 May.
May 2021: UPMRC achieved another major engineering excellence in Kanpur Metro Project. The UP Metro engineer coordinated the Uttar Pradesh Power Transmission Corporation Limited (UPPTCL), erected a safe and successful 4 U-girders after raising the height of 220kV high voltage power transmission line on GT Road, as of 19 May.
May 2021: Preliminary work has commenced for the 8.621 km underground section of Kanpur Metro Rail Project. After performing Bhoomi Pujan, the team of engineers started work at the proposed Naveen Market metro station, which is a part of Corridor-1 of Kanpur MRTS Project, as of 26 May.
Jun 2021: 500th U-girder has been erected successfully by the Uttar Pradesh Metro Rail Corporation (UPMRC) for the 9 km long Priority Corridor, running from IIT Kanpur to Motijheel. The first U-girder was erected in August last year, and the 500th U-girder was placed in less than a year, i.e., only in 312 days. The casting of these U-girders is carrying out at the Lakhanpur Casting Yard, and now only 38 more U-Girders are left to be cast, as of 22 June.
Jun 2021: Uttar Pradesh Metro Rail Corporation (UPMRC) has completed the track laying work for a stretch of around 1 km, from IIT Kanpur to Kalyanpur Railway station for the 9 km long Priority Corridor, running from IIT Kanpur to Motijheel of Kanpur Metro Rail Project, as of 24 June.
Jul 2021: The installation work of seven major and biggest machines in Kanpur Metro Depot has started with the installation of a Fully Automatic CNC Under the Floor Pit Wheel Length Machine (for rail wheel turning), as of 3 July.
Jul 2021: The construction of IIT Metro Station, the first metro station of the priority section of Kanpur Metro, is almost complete and this metro station has been decorated in a special way. The walls of the IIT Metro station depict engineering and technology with exquisite architectural artwork from the outside, as of 6 July.
Jul 2021: Along with the construction of Kanpur Metro, the UP Metro Administration has also started the reconstruction of the roads which are becoming damaged and potholed, as of 9 July.
Jul 2021: In the priority section of Kanpur Metro, the testing of the load-bearing capacity of the elevated track started, as of 11 July.
Jul 2021: The track laying work from IIT to SPM metro station in the priority section of Kanpur Metro has been completed. With this, the track laying work including ballast at Metro Depot at Polytechnic has also been completed 65 percent, as of 22 July.
Jul 2021: To weld the tracks, Flash Butt Welding Plant was lifted by crane and brought to the elevated viaduct, as of 23 July.
Jul 2021: A total of 29 metro stations of both the corridors of the Kanpur Metro Project will be known by their common names, as well as unique code names. These unique code names has been approved by Indian Railways, as of 28 July.
Aug 2021: Alstom to deliver first trainset for Kanpur Metro by September. The rakes are being made fully in India at Alstom's manufacturing plant in Savli, Gujarat, as of 10 August.
Aug 2021: UPMRC finishes 85% of construction in the priority corridor from IIT to Motijheel, as of 13 August.
Aug 2021: Trial run for the metro trains on the priority corridor is decided to conduct on 15 November, as of 26 August.
Aug 2021: UPMRC finishes 95% of construction in the priority corridor from IIT to Motijheel, as of 29 August.
Aug 2021: Alstom confirms to deliver first trainset of Kanpur Metro by 15 September. The metro coaches will be loaded on road trailers, and will be flagged off for Kanpur on September 5 from Alstom's manufacturing plant at Savli, Gujarat. The journey is expected to last 10–12 days, slating the arrival of carriages in the city by 15 September, as of 31 August.
Sep 2021: UPMRC erects 600th U-Girder of priority section last night, 8.5 km elevated viaduct ready out of 9 km, as of 11 September.
Sep 2021: Alstom delivers first trainset for Kanpur Metro, which are fully indigenously manufactured at Alstom's manufacturing plant, from Savli, Gujarat, as of 18 September.
Oct 2021: The second leg of Phase-I of metro construction work between Chunniganj and Nayaganj will commence from Monday, as of 11 October.
Oct 2021: Eight firms bid for ₹ 1,250 crore underground construction contract for Kanpur Metro, as of 17 October.
Oct 2021: Alstom delivers second trainset for Kanpur Metro, as of 20 October.
Oct 2021: The first metro trainset was taken as a trial run from the assembling area to depot. Testing of the trainset's doors and signals were also taken, as of 25 October.
Oct 2021: First trial of the trainset conducted on the priority corridor from depot to University Metro Station, as of 30 October.
Nov 2021: CM Yogi Adityanath to flag off Kanpur Metro trial run on the entire priority Corridor on 10 November, as of 8 November.
Nov 2021: CM Yogi Adityanath flags off Kanpur Metro trial run on the entire priority corridor. Daily commercial operations on the priority corridor will begin from 31 December, as of 10 November.
Dec 2021: PM Modi inaugurated the start of commercial operations of Kanpur Metro on 28 December.

Network map

See also
 Urban rail transit in India
 Uttar Pradesh Metro Rail Corporation
 Lucknow Metro
 Agra Metro
 Noida Metro
 Uttar Pradesh State Road Transport Corporation

References

Rapid transit in Uttar Pradesh
Transport in Kanpur
Standard gauge railways in India
Railway lines opened in 2021